This is a List of African Championships medalists in sailing.

470

RS:X

See also
ASCON

References

Sailing-related lists